is a railway station on the Keio Line in Setagaya, Tokyo, Japan, operated by the private railway operator Keio Corporation. It is the westernmost station of the Keio Line in the 23 special wards of Tokyo. Trains cross the Setagaya-Chōfu border west of the station.

Station layout
The station has two ground-level side platforms serving two tracks. Both platforms are connected by stairs to two small underground concourses beneath the tracks.

Platforms

History
It was renamed Chitose-karasuyama on 7 August 1929.

Passenger statistics
In fiscal 2011, the station was used by an average of 74,518 passengers daily.

Surrounding area
On both the north and south sides of the station lie large shopping districts. Just north of the station is the Karasuyama District Administration Office.

References

External links

 Keio station information 

Keio Line
Stations of Keio Corporation
Railway stations in Tokyo
Railway stations in Japan opened in 1913